Zarai Taraqiati Football Club was a Pakistani football club  based in Islamabad, Islamabad Capital Territory representing the Zarai Taraqiati Bank Limited formerly known as Agriculture Development Bank of Pakistan. In its brief history the club won the Football Federation League, second division of Pakistani football in its second year on inception.

The club played their home games in Jinnah Sports Stadium, Islamabad, which is also the home stadium for Pakistan Television and Pakistan national football team.

History
The club was formed in 2010 by Zarai Taraqiati Bank Limited to represent the bank in departmental matches. It was the fifth bank-based team to play in top-division of Pakistani football after Habib Bank, National Bank and now defunct Allied Bank and Muslim Commercial Bank. In 2010–11, the club entered in the 2010–11 Pakistan Football Federation League, they were placed in the group B with Ashraf Sugar Mills, Pakistan Railways and Pakistan Television. On 29 November 2010, the club played its first-ever competitive match in a 2–0 loss to Pakistan Television, four days they lost to Pakistan Railways with the similar scoreline. On 1 December 2010, the club recorded its first ever victory when they defeated Ashraf Sugar Mills 2–1. The club finished third in their group and failed to qualify for the final stages.

Success
In 2011–12 the club once again competed in the Football Federation League. The club finished second in their group, winning three consecutive matches against Higher Education Commission, Mecca Flour Mills and Pakistan Railways before losing the final league game to rivals Pakistan Television. Both Zarai Taraqiati and Pakistan Television advanced to final stage, Zarai Taraqiati won topped their group two points ahead of Pakistan Television and got promotion to Pakistan Premier League winning 2 out of 3 games, losing their only game to rival Pakistan Television. They defeated Wohaib 3–1 in the finals of 2011–12 Pakistan Football Federation League to win the second division title.

On 7 September 2012, the club played their first ever 2012–13 Pakistan Premier League match against title-holders Khan Research Laboratories in a 0–3 loss at home. The club went 7 matches without any win, drawing four and losing three matches. The club recorded their first win of the season against Baloch Quetta in a 1–0 victory. On 17 September, the defeated Karachi Port Trust 2–0, causing a major upset, and on 25 December, completed the double over Karachi Port Trust when they defeated them 2–1 away. The club ended its first top-flight season with just victories from 30 matches and finished at 14th place, two points above relegation zone.

Downfall and dissolution
Zarai Taraqiati started their 2013–14 Pakistan Premier League with 3–0 defeat to Pakistan Air Force. Their first victory of the campaign came against Pakistan Navy with a 2–0 away win. The club recorded their biggest victory after defeating newly promoted Pak Afghan Clearing 3–0 away. They withdrew after playing just seventeen games and all remaining matches were awarded 3–0 loss to them. Soon after withdrawing from the league, the parental organisation dissolved the team.

Rivalry
Zarai Taraqiati shared rivalry Pakistan Television as they shared their home stadium. The club met for the first time in group stage of 2010–11 Pakistan Football Federation League, Zarai Taraqiati lost their first ever professional match to Pakistan Television 2–0. Their next clash was in the 2011–12 Pakistan Football Federation League, where Pakistan Television broke the undefeated run of Zarai Taraqiati, beating them 1–0. In the final-stages, Zarai Taraqiati again lost 2–0 to Pakistan Television, with Pakistan Television's Salah-ud-Din scoring 3 goals in 2 matches against Zarai Taraqiati. Overall Zarai Taraqiati lost 3 out of 3 matches against Pakistan Television, scoring zero goals and conceding 5.

Honours
Football Federation League
Champions (1): 2011–12

References

Defunct association football clubs in Pakistan
Financial services association football clubs in Pakistan